Salmagundi; or The Whim-whams and Opinions of Launcelot Langstaff, Esq. & Others, commonly referred to as Salmagundi, was a 19th-century satirical periodical created and written by American writer Washington Irving, his oldest brother William, and James Kirke Paulding. The collaborators produced twenty issues at irregular intervals between January 24, 1807 and January 15, 1808.

History
Irving and a few friends formed a group known as the "Lads of Kilkenny", described as “a loosely knit pack of literary-minded young blades out for a good time.” When they weren't spending time at the Park Theatre or the Shakespeare Tavern at the corner of Nassau and Fulton Streets, they gathered at an old family mansion on the Passaic River which Gouverneur Kemble had inherited and which they called "Cockloft Hall".<ref>"Washington Irving, Cockloft Hall, and 'Salmagundi' Papers", Historic Newark, Newark, 1916, p.25]</ref>

Besides Irving, the group included his brothers William, Peter, and Ebenezer; and the Kemble brothers, Gouverneur and Peter. William Irving was married to Julia Paulding, sister of his friend James Kirke Paulding. Paulding was married to the Kemble's sister Gertrude. Some of them eventually organized to create the literary magazine called Salmagundi. Salmagundi lampooned New York City culture and politics in a manner much like today's Mad magazine. It was in the November 11, 1807, issue that Irving first attached the name "Gotham" to New York City, based on the alleged stupidity of the people of Gotham, Nottinghamshire.

Irving and his collaborators published the periodical using a wide variety of pseudonyms, including Will Wizard, Launcelot Langstaff, Pindar Cockloft, and Mustapha Rub-a-Dub Keli Khan.
 
Irving and Paulding discontinued Salmagundi in January 1808, following a disagreement with publisher David Longworth over profits.

Notes

References
 Irving, Washington. "Letters of Jonathan Oldstyle, Gent./Salmagundi." The Complete Works of Washington Irving, Volume 6. Edited by Bruce Granger & Martha Hartzog. (Twayne, 1977) 
 Jones, Brian Jay. Washington Irving: An American Original. (Arcade, 2008) 

Further reading
 Hankins, Laurel V. "The Art of Retreat: Salmagundi’s Elbow-Chair Domesticity." Nineteenth Century Literature'' 71.4 (2017): 431-456 [https://ncl.ucpress.edu/content/ucpncl/71/4/431.full.pdf online. 

Satirical magazines published in the United States
Defunct magazines published in the United States
Essay collections by Washington Irving
Magazines established in 1807
Magazines disestablished in 1808
Short story collections by Washington Irving
Works by Washington Irving